Saint-Germer-de-Fly is a commune in the Oise department in northern France. It is distinguished by the remains of its former abbey, including the current parish church, dating from the 12th century.

See also
 Communes of the Oise department

References

Communes of Oise